George Washington Preparatory High School is a public four-year high school in the Westmont section of unincorporated Los Angeles County, California. Founded in 1926, the school has a Los Angeles address but is not located in the city limits of Los Angeles. The mascot is the General, a reference to the school's namesake George Washington. The school colors are red and blue. The school serves many areas in South Los Angeles and unincorporated areas around South Los Angeles, including Athens, West Athens and Westmont.

In addition it serves the LAUSD section of Hawthorne. It was the location for a 1986 TV movie Hard Lessons, depicting Denzel Washington as the new principal, who sets out to rid the school of gang violence and drugs and restore educational values to the school. The current principal is Tony Booker. Two famous former principals are George McKenna, whom Denzel Washington portrayed in the movie Hard Lessons; and past LAUSD Board Member Marguerite LaMotte.

History
George Washington Preparatory High School was founded in 1927 as a six-year high school that slowly developed into a four-year school. The first graduating class was 1928 with 5 seniors. The school was badly damaged by the 1933 Long Beach earthquake and the students went to school in tents for a year or two. In 1935 Washington High began accepting 11th and 12th graders only, and before 1950, Washington Senior High School had expanded to include grades 10 through 12.

It was in the Los Angeles City High School District until 1961, when it merged into LAUSD.

In January 1983, a new founder, the famed George McKenna, redefined Washington High School as a college preparatory school, and George Washington Preparatory High School, "The Prep," became an academic institution for grades 9–12.

Background
The reorganization of Washington Preparatory High School into Small Learning Communities (SLCs) began in 2006. The purpose of the SLC is to develop a sense of unity and cohesiveness and to foster the individual needs of students. The SLCs that were established as a result of this effort are: Etech (Engineering and Technology); ELMS (Ethics, Leadership, and Mediation Scholars); S.T.A.R.S (Visual and Performing Arts); BIZ (Business); SHAPE (Health and Fitness); and Law and Justice. The three Magnet programs have remained intact. During subsequent years, Washington added Performing Arts, Math/Science, and Communication Arts Magnets and achieved honors in scholastic, athletic and extra-curricular competition. As of 2009, in order to graduate and participate in senior activities such as prom, senior picnic, and grad night seniors must earn 230 credits, pass the California High School Exit Exam, and maintain 95% attendance.

Demographics
During the 2008–09 school year, there were a total of 2,440 students attending the high school.
46.7% Hispanic, 0.2% White, 52.4% Black, 0.2% Native American, 0.1% Asian, 0.3% Pacific Islander

Notable alumni

Art Laboe, Disc Jockey

Estes Banks, NFL running back
Barbara Billingsley, television and film actress
Eddie Bressoud, Major League Baseball
Steve Bryant, National Football League
Raphel Cherry, NFL defensive back
Don Clark, NFL offensive guard
Dick Dale, surf guitarist
Clarence Davis, NFL running back
Kori Dickerson, NFL tight end
Drakeo the Ruler, rapper
Karl Farmer, NFL wide receiver
Mark Fields, NFL linebacker
Gil Garcetti, L.A. County DA
Teresa Graves, American actress and singer.
Ice Cube, rapper and actor
Robert Illes, (television), Emmy winning Writer/producer
James Lofton, NFL Hall of Fame wide receiver
Hugh McElhenny, class of 1947, professional football player
Jerry Norman, college basketball coach
Eva Pigford, model and actress 
Oliver Ross, NFL offensive lineman
Ernie Shelton, NCAA champion high jumper, 1955–56
Raymond Washington,  American gangster 
Esther Williams, actress
Stanley Williams, founder of the Crips
Murry Wilson, songwriter, talent manager, record producer

References

External links
 Washington Preparatory High School

High schools in Los Angeles County, California
Los Angeles Unified School District schools
Educational institutions established in 1926
Public high schools in California
1926 establishments in California